The 2020–21 season was the 76th season in the existence of VfL Wolfsburg and the club's 24th consecutive season in the top flight of German football. In addition to the domestic league, VfL Wolfsburg participated in this season's editions of the DFB-Pokal and in the UEFA Europa League. The season covered the period from 6 August 2020 to 30 June 2021.

Players

First-team squad

Players out on loan

Transfers

In

Out

Pre-season and friendlies

Competitions

Overview

Bundesliga

League table

Results summary

Results by round

Matches
The league fixtures were announced on 7 August 2020.

DFB-Pokal

UEFA Europa League

Statistics

Appearances and goals

|-
! colspan=14 style=background:#dcdcdc; text-align:center| Goalkeepers

|-
! colspan=14 style=background:#dcdcdc; text-align:center| Defenders
 

  
 
 

|-
! colspan=14 style=background:#dcdcdc; text-align:center| Midfielders

 
 
 

 
 
 
|-
! colspan=14 style=background:#dcdcdc; text-align:center| Forwards
 

|-
! colspan=14 style=background:#dcdcdc; text-align:center| Players transferred out during the season 
 

 

|-

Goalscorers

References

External links

VfL Wolfsburg seasons
Wolfsburg
Wolfsburg